Fantasyland is one of the "themed lands" at all of the Magic Kingdom-style parks run by The Walt Disney Company around the world. It is themed after Disney's animated fairy tale films. Each Fantasyland has a castle, as well as several gentle rides themed after those Disney films.

Disneyland

History and environs

Fantasyland is one of the original themed lands at Disneyland. Fantasyland features Sleeping Beauty Castle at its front, which is also the park's icon, and  a central courtyard dominated by King Arthur Carrousel, in front of which sits a sword in an anvil; several times each day a costumed Merlin helps a child pull the sword from it. Walt Disney said, "What youngster has not dreamed of flying with Peter Pan over moonlit London, or tumbling into Alice's nonsensical Wonderland? In Fantasyland, these classic stories of everyone's youth have become realities for youngsters - of all ages - to participate in."

In 1983, Fantasyland received a major facelift (dubbed "New Fantasyland") and the attraction façades changed from a Renaissance motif to a fantasy mock up of a Bavarian village. Fantasyland's main entrance is through Sleeping Beauty Castle. The entrance also contains a separate walk-through attraction that opened in 1957 but was closed from 2001–2008 due to security concerns following the September 11, attacks. The attraction re-opened in May 2008.

The plaque in front of the castle marks the spot where the Disneyland Time Capsule is buried. Sealed on the 40th anniversary of the park (1995), it contains different items from the history of Disney parks. It is scheduled to be opened in the year 2035, forty years after it was first sealed. 
The famed "Fantasy in the Sky Fireworks" show was introduced in 1956, but Tinker Bell's first flight wasn't until 1961. The first Tinker Bell was Tiny Kline, former circus aerialist. Multiple shows have replaced this most involving some sort of 'flying' character, such as Tinker Bell.

Fantasyland was said, by Walt Disney, to be his favorite land in the park.

Current attractions and entertainment
 Alice in Wonderland (1958–present)
 Casey Jr. Circus Train (1955–present)
 Dumbo the Flying Elephant (1955–present)
 It's a Small World (1966–present)
 Fantasy Faire
Royal Hall
Royal Theatre
Clopin's Music Box
Fantasyland Theatre (2013–present)
 Tale of the Lion King(2022–present)
 King Arthur Carrousel/The Sword In The Stone (1955–present)
 Mad Tea Party (1955–present)
 Matterhorn Bobsleds (1959–present)
 Mr. Toad's Wild Ride (1955–present)
 Peter Pan's Flight (1955–present)
 Pinocchio's Daring Journey (1983–present)
 Pixie Hollow (2008–present)
 Sleeping Beauty Castle walk-through (1957–2001, 2008–present))
 Snow White Grotto (1961–present)
 Snow White's Enchanted Wish (2021–present)
 Storybook Land Canal Boats (1955–present)
 Mickey & Minnie's Runaway Railway (January to March 2023)
 The Pearly Band

Former attractions and entertainment
 Snow White and Her Adventures (1955–82)
 Canal Boats of the World (1955)
 Mickey Mouse Club Circus (1955–56)
 Mickey Mouse Club Theater (1955–82, replaced by Pinocchio's Daring Journey)
 Keller's Jungle Killers (1956)
 Skyway to Tomorrowland (1956–94)
 Motor Boat Cruise (1957–93)
 Midget Autopia (1957–66)
 Fantasyland Autopia (1959–99)
 Skull Rock (1960–82)
 Snow White's Scary Adventures (1983–2020)
 Videopolis (1985–2006)
 Fantasyland Depot (1961–93, re-themed as Toon Town Depot)
 Disney Afternoon Avenue, featuring Disney Afternoon characters (1991):
 Baloo's Dressing Room
 Motor Boat Cruise to Gummi Glen
 Rescue Rangers Raceway
 Ariel's Grotto in Triton's Garden (1996–2008, replaced by Pixie Hollow)
 Fantasyland Theater:
 "Plane Crazy" Stage Show (1991–2012) 
 Beauty and the Beast Live on Stage (1992–95)
 The Spirit of Pocahontas (1995–97)
 Disney's Animazement - The Musical (1998–2001)
 Minnie's Christmas Party (2001-02)
 Disney Princess Fantasy Faire (2006–12)
 Mickey and the Magical Map (2013–20)
 Fantasia Gardens (1993–2006)
 Royal Theatre
 "Frozen" (2015–16)

Current restaurants and refreshments
 Edelweiss Snacks
 Maurice's Treats
 Red Rose Taverne
 Troubadour Tavern

Former restaurants and refreshments
 Character Foods (1955–81)
 Welch's Grape Juice Stand (1956–81)
 Yumz (1985–2004)
 Enchanted Cottage Sweets & Treats (2004–2012)
 Village Haus Restaurant (1983–2017)

Current shops
 Bibbidi Bobbidi Boutique
 The Castle Holiday Shop
 Stromboli's Cart
 Royal Reception
 Fairy Tale Treasures
 "It's a Small World" Toy Shop
 Le Petit Chalet
 The Mad Hatter

Former shops
 Merlin's Magic Shop (1955–83)
 Tinker Bell Toy Shoppe (1957–2008)
 Castle Candy Kitchen/Shoppe (1958–67)
 Arts & Crafts Shop (1958–82)
 Clock Shop (1963–69)
 Castle Arts (1983–87)
 Mickey's Christmas Chalet (1983–87)
 Geppetto's Arts & Crafts (1983–2007)
 Briar Rose Cottage (1987–91)
 Castle Christmas Shop (1987–96)
 Disney Villains (1991–1996)
 The Castle Heraldry Shoppe (1994–2017)
 Names Unraveled (1995–2005)
 Knight Shop (1997–98)
 Princess Boutique (1997–2005)
 Villains Lair (1998–2004)
 50th Anniversary Shop (2005–06)
 Three Fairies Magic Crystals (2006–08)

Magic Kingdom
 
Fantasyland at Magic Kingdom at Walt Disney World Resort has 10 main attractions.

Expansion
The area went through a large expansion and renovation between 2010 and 2014.

Conceptual artwork for the expansion shows several new additions and changes. Included is a new dark ride themed to Disney's 1989 film The Little Mermaid (also located at Disney California Adventure), and an area themed to Disney's 1991 animated film Beauty and the Beast featuring the Beast's Castle with a new sit-down restaurant and Belle's cottage. There is also a rest area themed to Disney's 2010 musical film Tangled, and an interactive queue for Peter Pan's Flight.

Mickey's Toontown Fair was closed on February 11, 2011 in order to build the Storybook Circus area of the Fantasyland extension. Some elements of Mickey's Toontown Fair were demolished and others were re-themed to the new area. Storybook Circus is based on elements of the 1940 animated film Dumbo and other characters from the Mickey Mouse universe. The Dumbo the Flying Elephant ride was removed from Fantasyland and rebuilt in Storybook Circus, the new version doubling the capacity of the old ride and introducing an interactive queue. The Barnstormer at Goofy's Wiseacre Farm was renamed The Barnstormer featuring the Great Goofini. Storybook Circus has been completed and became fully open to the public on October 4, 2012. The first stage was completed on March 12, 2012 ("The Barnstormer," the renovated Storybook Circus train station, and the first half of the new Dumbo ride). The second phase of Storybook Circus (the second half of Dumbo, the indoor queue area, and the Casey Jr. Splash 'n' Soak Station) opened in July 2012. The third and final phase (Pete's Silly Sideshow and Big Top Souvenirs) saw the completion of Storybook Circus on October 4, 2012.

Snow White's Scary Adventures closed on May 31, 2012. The original ride was removed and Princess Fairytale Hall, a new Disney Princess "meet and greet" area, opened on September 18, 2013, where the attraction previously existed. An area themed to Disney's 1937 film Snow White and the Seven Dwarfs features the dwarfs' cottage and a new roller coaster ride called the Seven Dwarfs Mine Train. The coaster features a first-of-its-kind ride system with a train of ride vehicles that swing back and forth, responding to the twists and turns of the track. Although not part of the original plans for the new Fantasyland, this attraction took the place of several proposed interactive Disney Princess meet and greets; these have been removed from the updated plans for the expansion. The Seven Dwarfs Mine Train opened on May 28, 2014, completing New Fantasyland.

Current attractions and entertainment

Enchanted Forest
 Ariel's Grotto (1996–2010, 2012–present)
 Under the Sea: Journey of the Little Mermaid (2012–present)
 Enchanted Tales with Belle
 Seven Dwarfs Mine Train (2014–present)
 Mad Tea Party (1971–present)
 The Many Adventures of Winnie the Pooh (1999-present)

Storybook Circus
 The Barnstormer (2012–present)
 Casey Jr, Splash 'N' Soak Station (2012–present)
 Dumbo the Flying Elephant (1971–2012 and 2012–present)
 Main Street Philharmonic at Storybook Circus
 Pete's Silly Sideshow
 Walt Disney World Railroad (1971–present)

Castle Courtyard 
 Cinderella Castle (1971–present)
 It's a Small World (1971–present)
 Merida "Meet and Greet" at Fairytale Garden
 Mickey's PhilharMagic (2003–present)
 Peter Pan's Flight (1971–present)
 Prince Charming Regal Carrousel (1971–present)
 Princess Fairytale Hall
 Mickey's Magical Friendship Faire (2021-present)

Former attractions and entertainment
 Mickey Mouse Revue (1971–80)
 20,000 Leagues Under the Sea: Submarine Voyage (1971–94)
 Mr. Toad's Wild Ride (1971–98) 
 Magic Journeys (1987–93)
 Skyway to Tomorrowland (1971–99)
 Snow White's Adventures (1971–94)
 Snow White's Scary Adventures (1971–2012)
 Legend of the Lion King (1994–2002)
 Storytime with Belle (1999–2010)
 Pooh's Playful Spot (2005–10)
 Dream Along with Mickey (2006–16)
 Mickey's Royal Friendship Faire (2016–20)

Current restaurants and refreshments
 Be Our Guest Restaurant
 Cheshire Café
 Cinderella's Royal Table
 The Friar's Nook
 Gaston's Tavern
 Pinocchio Village Haus
 Prince Eric's Village Market
 Storybook Treats

Former restaurants 
 Hook's Tavern
 Enchanted Grove (1983-2011, replaced with Cheshire Cafe)
 Round Table (current site of Storybook Treats, 1971-1994)
 Mrs. Potts' Cupboard (1994-2010)
 Lancer's Inn (current site of Friar's Nook, 1971-1986)
 Gurgi's Munchings and Crunchings (1986-1993)
 Lumiere's Kitchen (1993-2006)
 The Village Frye Shoppe (2006-2009)

Current shops
 Bibbidi Bobbidi Boutique 
 Big Top Souvenirs
 Bonjour! Village Gifts
 Casey Jr. RailRoad Mercantile
 Castle Couture
 Fantasy Faire
 Alice in Wonderland Shop
 Sir Mickey's
 Mr. Tumnus' Cave

Tokyo Disneyland
 
Tokyo Disneyland has two original attractions among the usual dark rides: Cinderella's Fairy Tale Hall, which features the story of Cinderella in a walk-through style attraction, and Pooh's Hunny Hunt, which uses a trackless ride system. It is also the only version of Fantasyland to still feature the original version of Dumbo the Flying Elephant with only ten flying elephants, while the other versions of the attraction have sixteen elephants.

On April 29, 2015, The Oriental Land Company revealed a major expansion/re-imagining of the area that included the addition of areas based on Beauty and the Beast and Alice in Wonderland. Alice in Wonderland was supposed to be the theme for a new area that would have replaced the current It's a Small World building, which would have been moved next to Space Mountain. However, the plan was cancelled and been replaced by an indoor theater, The Happy Ride With Baymax, a ride based on the 2014 film Big Hero 6 in Tomorrowland, and a meet and greet attraction with Minnie Mouse in Mickey's Toontown.
On September 19, 2019, it was announced that the opening date of this area is April 15, 2020. However, due to the COVID-19 pandemic in Japan, this date was moved to September 28, 2020.

Current attractions and entertainment
 Alice's Tea Party (1986–present)
 Castle Carrousel (1983–present)
 Cinderella Castle (1983–present)
 Cinderella's Fairy Tale Hall (2011–present)
 Court Jesters Quartet
 Dumbo the Flying Elephant (1983–present)
 Enchanted Tale of Beauty and the Beast (2020–present)
 Fantasyland Forest Theatre featuring Mickey's Magical Music World (2021–present)
 The Haunted Mansion (1983–present)
 It's a Small World (1983–present)
 Mickey's PhilharMagic (2011–present)
 Peter Pan's Flight (1983–present)
 Pinocchio's Daring Journey (1983–present)
 Pooh's Hunny Hunt (2000–present)
 Snow White's Adventures (1983–present)
 Snow White Grotto (1983–present)
 The Sword in the Stone

Former attractions and entertainment
 Skyway (1983–98)
 Mickey Mouse Revue (1983–2009)
 Cinderella Castle Mystery Tour (1986–2006)
 Small World Stage (1983–95)
 The Kids of the Kingdom (1983–88)
 Let's Be Friends (1988–89)
 It's a Musical World (1989–93)
 Mickey Mouse Club (1993–96)
 Alice's Wonderland Tales (1995)

Current restaurants and refreshments
 Cleo's
 Queen of Hearts Banquet Hall
 Troubadour Tavern
 Village Pastry
 La Taverne de Gaston

Current shops
 Brave Little Tailor Shoppe
 The Glass Slipper
 Kingdom Treasure
 Pleasure Island Candies
 Pooh Corner
 Stromboli's Wagon
 Village Shoppes
 Bonjour Gifts
 La Belle Librairie
 Little Town Traders

Former shops
 Fantasy Gifts (closed on February 15, 2018)

Disneyland Paris
 
The fourth Fantasyland to open was in France, at Disneyland Park, previously named Euro Disneyland. Themed as a fairy tale village, this land specifically notes the European origins of the source material for many Disney animated films.

A unique attraction of the park was Les Pirouettes du Vieux Moulin, a Ferris wheel added to the rear of The Old Mill building in 1993. The Old Mill, which resembles a Dutch windmill and was inspired by the 1937 Academy Award-winning Disney cartoon of the same name, was a feature of the park when it opened in 1992, and serves drinks and snacks. The ride closed in the early 2000s, but the wheel and its eight bucket-like passenger cars were left in place and were seasonally decorated. It was later reformed, with the buckets removed, the mill's building serving as a snack counter and the queue area as a meet and greet area.

Current attractions and entertainment
 Alice's Curious Labyrinth (1992–present)
 Blanche-Neige et les Sept Nains (Snow White's Scary Adventures) (1992–present)
 Le Carrousel de Lancelot (Lancelot's Carousel) (1992–present)
 Casey Jr. - Le Petit Train du Cirque (Casey Jr. Circus Train) (1994–present)
 Le Château de la Belle au Bois Dormant (Sleeping Beauty Castle) (1992–present)
 Disneyland Paris Railroad - Fantasyland Station (1992–present)
 Dumbo the Flying Elephant (1992–present)
 La Galerie de la Belle au Bois Dormant (Sleeping Beauty’s  Castle)
 Le Théâtre du Château (The Castle Stage)
 It's a Small World (1992–present)
 Mad Hatter's Tea Cups (1992–present)
 Meet Mickey Mouse
 Le Pays de Contes de Fées (Storybook Land Canal Boats) (1994–present)
 Peter Pan's Flight (1992–present)
 Princess Pavilion
 La Tanière du Dragon (The Dragon's Lair) (1992–present)
 Les Voyages de Pinocchio (Pinocchio's Fantastic Journey) (1992–present)
 The Sword in the Stone

Former attractions and entertainment
 Les Pirouettes du Vieux Moulin
 Fantasy Festival Stage:
 Winnie the Pooh and Friends, too! (1998–2008)
 World Chorus

Current restaurants and refreshments
 L'Arbre Enchanté (The Enchanted Tree)
 L'Auberge de Cendrillon
 Au Chalet de la Marionnette
 March Hare Refreshments
 The Old Mill
 Pizzeria Bella Notte
 Toad Hall Restaurant

Former restaurants and refreshments
 Fantasia Gelati

Current shops
 La Bottega di Geppetto (Gepetto's Shop)
 La Boutique du Château (The Castle Shop)
 La Chaumière des Sept Nains (The Seven Dwarfs' Cottage)
 La Confiserie des Trois Fées (The Three Fairies' Sweet Shop)
 La Ménagerie du Royaume (The Kingdom Menagerie)
 Merlin l'Enchanteur (Merlin the Magician)
 La Petite Maison des Jouets (The Little House of Toys)
 La Ferme de Bo Peep (Bo Peep’s Farmhouse)
 Thumper’s Burrow Treats
 Sir Mickey's Boutique

Hong Kong Disneyland
 
Hong Kong Disneyland features the most prominent Disney trademark, Castle of Magical Dreams and many of the classic fairy tale characters from everyone's childhood find their "homes" here, all have their own attractions, and the rest of the gang hangs out at the Fantasy Gardens, the meeting point for character greetings.

In August 2014, the second Pixie Hollow decor had moved closer to Adventureland, and the area that up to the Fantasyland Train Station, was surrounded by fences hiding the works that started recently  for "Fairy Tale Forest", which opened on December 17, 2015 as part of the park's 10th anniversary celebration presented by Pandora.

Current attractions and entertainment
 Cinderella Carousel (2005–present)
 Dumbo the Flying Elephant (2005–present)
 Fairy Tale Forest (2015–present)
 Fantasy Gardens (2005–present)
 Hong Kong Disneyland Railroad – Fantasyland Station (2005–present)
 It's a Small World (2008–present)
 Mad Hatter Tea Cups (2005–present)
 The Many Adventures of Winnie the Pooh (2005–present)
 Mickey's PhilharMagic (2005–present)
 Snow White Grotto (2005–present)
 The Royal Reception Hall  (2020–present)
 Storybook Theater
 Mickey and the Wondrous Book  (2015–present)
 Sword in the Stone
 Castle of Magical Dreams (2020–present)

Former attractions and entertainment
 Storybook Theater
 The Golden Mickeys (2005–15)
 Sleeping Beauty Castle (2005–18)

Restaurants and refreshments
 Clopin’s Festival of Foods
 Popcorn, Cotton Candy, Frozen Lollipops Cart
 Royal Banquet Hall
 Small World Ice Cream
 Soya Chicken Leg, Corn on the Cob, Frozen Lollipops Cart

Current shops
 Bibbidi Bobbidi Boutique 
 Enchanted Treasures
 Merlin's Magic Portraits
 Merlin's Treasures
 Pooh Corner
 Storybook Shoppe

Shanghai Disneyland Park
 
Opened on June 16, 2016, Shanghai Disneyland Park also features a version of Fantasyland. The park's castle, called Enchanted Storybook Castle, represents all Disney Princesses and is the largest of all six Magic Kingdom castles. A brand new unique attraction called Voyage to the Crystal Grotto, a guided boat ride tour through the castle, and around Fantasyland, is also included.

Current attractions and entertainment
Alice in Wonderland Maze (2016–present)
Bai Ling Storytime
Enchanted Storybook Castle (2016–present)
Voyage to the Crystal Grotto (2016–present)
Frozen: A Sing-Along Celebration inside Evergreen Playhouse (2016–present)
Hunny Pot Spin
The Many Adventures of Winnie the Pooh (2016–present)
Once Upon a Time Adventure
Storybook Court
Peter Pan's Flight (2016–present)
Seven Dwarfs Mine Train (2016–present)

Current restaurants and refreshments
Fairy Godmother's Cupboard
Merlin's Magic Recipe
Pinocchio Village Kitchen
Royal Banquet Hall
Tangled Tree Tavern
Troubadour Treats

Former restaurants and refreshments
Celebration Cafe (2016–18)

Current shops
Be Our Guest Boutique
Bibbidi Bobbidi Boutique
Cottage Curios
Fantasy Faire
Hundred Acre Goods
Mickey & Minnie's Mercantile
Mountainside Treasures

References

 
Amusement parks opened in 1955
Themed areas in Walt Disney Parks and Resorts
Disneyland
Magic Kingdom
Tokyo Disneyland
Disneyland Park (Paris)
Hong Kong Disneyland
Shanghai Disneyland
1955 establishments in California